Scott Christian Forster (born October 27, 1971) is an American former professional baseball pitcher. He played in Major League Baseball (MLB) for the Montreal Expos in 2000.

External links

1971 births
Living people
American expatriate baseball players in Canada
Baseball players from Philadelphia
Bridgeport Bluefish players
Camden Riversharks players
Harrisburg Senators players
Huntsville Stars players
James Madison Dukes baseball players
Jupiter Hammerheads players
Louisville RiverBats players
Major League Baseball pitchers
Montreal Expos players
Ottawa Lynx players
Somerset Patriots players
Vermont Expos players
West Palm Beach Expos players